Koreasat 6 is a South Korean communications satellite operated by Koreasat. Koreasat 6 is the second satellite launched by operator KT (Korea Telecom) Corporation which weighed about 2750 kg at the launching time. This satellite orbital position at 116 degrees East and provides broadcasting services and telecommunications throughout Korea.

References

Communications satellites
Satellites of South Korea
Spacecraft launched in 2010
2010 in South Korea